The 1964 Provincial Speedway League was the fifth and final season of the Provincial League in the United Kingdom. Twelve speedway teams took part. A second division of British speedway would not return until 1968.

Season summary
The 1964 season started in controversy which led to the Provincial League running 'black'. Officially the 1964 Provincial League season did not exist.

Wolverhampton Wolves refused to move up to the National League after winning the Provincial League title in 1963. The two leagues could not agree about the situation which led to the Provincial League being outlawed by the Speedway Control Board.

All National League riders were forbidden to ride on Provincial League tracks. Provincial League riders were warned by the Speedway Control Board that they were in breach of ACU regulations and could be suspended from all competitive racing. They were also barred from the Speedway World Championship.

The Stoke Potters, St Austell Gulls and Rayleigh Rockets all withdrew from the league for various reasons  before the season started. The Sunderland Stars joined the league but then withdrew after riding only three matches. However Glasgow Tigers and the Newport Wasps joined and completed the season.

Newcastle Diamonds won the final Provincial League and their first title.

Final table

M = Matches; W = Wins; D = Draws; L = Losses; Pts = Total Points

Sunderland Saints withdrew after three matches - record expunged.

Top Five Riders (League only)

Provincial League Knockout Cup
The 1964 Provincial League Knockout Cup was the fifth edition of the Knockout Cup for the Provincial League teams. Newport Wasps were the winners.

First round

Second round

Semi-finals

Final

See also
List of United Kingdom Speedway League Champions
Knockout Cup (speedway)

References

Speedway Provincial League
Provincial
Provincial Speedway